Adnan Dirjal (born 26 January 1960 in Baghdad) is an Iraqi former footballer, national team coach, and as of May 2020 heads the Iraqi Ministry of Youth and Sports. He was one of Iraq's most prominent national team captains, who played as a defender.

On 14 September 2021 he won the presidency of the Iraqi Football Association.

Club career
Adnan, a defender, started his career with Al-Zawraa, where he won the Iraqi league and cup double in 1978/1979. He went on to join Al-Talaba, where he was one of the stars of a team that included Haris Mohammed, Jamal Ali and the great Hussein Saeed. At Al-Talaba Adnan won the Iraqi league two times and reached two cup finals.

His most successful club spell came at Al-Rasheed, the club owned by Saddam Hussein's eldest son Uday, where he captained the club and won three Iraqi league titles, two cups and a record three Arab Club Championships during the mid to late 80s.

Political career
He secured a position in Iraqi PM Mustafa Al-Kadhimi's cabinet in May 2020 when he was appointed Minister of Youth and Sports.

International career
Adnan made the step into international football early, helping Iraq win both the CISM World Military Championship and the Gulf Cup in 1979.  He later played at three Olympic Games, in 1980, 1984 and 1988, three Gulf Cup victories, and the Asian Games win over Kuwait in 1982. The biggest disappointment in a glittering career was missing the World Cup finals in Mexico in 1986 through injury.

International goals
Scores and results list Iraq's goal tally first.

Personal life
He has three sons and one daughter. One of them is Muhannad Darjal, who played professionally for Al Wakrah as a defender.

See also
 List of men's footballers with 100 or more international caps

References

External links

C.V.

1960 births
Living people
Sportspeople from Baghdad
Iraqi footballers
Al-Zawraa SC players
Al-Rasheed players
Iraqi football managers
Iraqi expatriate football managers
Expatriate football managers in Qatar
Iraqi expatriate sportspeople in Qatar
Footballers at the 1980 Summer Olympics
Footballers at the 1984 Summer Olympics
Footballers at the 1988 Summer Olympics
Olympic footballers of Iraq
Asian Games medalists in football
Footballers at the 1982 Asian Games
FIFA Century Club
Asian Games gold medalists for Iraq
Association football defenders
Medalists at the 1982 Asian Games
Government ministers of Iraq
Iraq international footballers